is a Japanese author, critic, economist, and translator. He translated some important works in computer technology such as "The Cathedral and the Bazaar" by Eric S. Raymond, "Code and Other Laws of Cyberspace" by Lawrence Lessig into Japanese. He is also the founder and chairman of Project Sugita Genpaku, which is a volunteer effort to translate free content texts into Japanese.

See also: Japanese literature, List of Japanese authors

See also
Paul Krugman

External links
YAMAGATA Hiroo: The Official Page
YAMAGATA Hiroo: The Official Page (in Japanese)
"Project Sugita Genpaku" (in Japanese)

1964 births
Living people
Japanese writers